Judge Peters may refer to:

John A. Peters (1864–1953) (1864–1953), judge of the United States District Court for the District of Maine
Nigel Peters (born 1952), circuit judge for England and Wales
Richard Peters (Continental Congress) (1744–1828), judge of the United States District Court for the District of Pennsylvania

See also
Justice Peters (disambiguation)